The top club is one of the men's team events at the annual Bowls England National Championships. Kings BC, arguably the leading team in England have won the event four years running and the team includes Louis Ridout, Jamie Chestney and Sam Tolchard.

Past winners

References

Bowls in England